Matteo Berrettini defeated Aslan Karatsev in the final, 6–1, 3–6, 7–6(7–0), to win the men's singles tennis title at the 2021 Serbia Open.

Andreas Seppi was the last defending champion after victory in 2012, but he decided not to participate this year.

Seeds
The top four seeds received a bye into the second round.

Draw

Finals

Top half

Bottom half

Qualifying

Seeds

Qualifiers

Lucky losers

Qualifying draw

First qualifier

Second qualifier

Third qualifier

Fourth qualifier

References

External links
Main draw
Qualifying draw

2021 ATP Tour
2021 Singles